Guru Nanak Gurdwara Smethwick (ਗੁਰੂ ਨਾਨਕ ਗੁਰਦੁਆਰਾ ਸਮੈਦਿਕ) is a Sikh gurdwara in Smethwick, in Sandwell, near Birmingham in the West Midlands of England. It was established in October 1958 in a former church building which had been bought earlier in the year at a cost of £11,600.

References

Further reading 
Webster, Len. The Turban-Wallah: a tale of Little India. Oxford: OUP, 1984. 
"People to People Week - the Sikhs," Warley News, 11 November 1965

Gurdwaras in England
Religious buildings and structures in the West Midlands (county)
Smethwick